Brusyliv (Ukrainian:Брусилів) may refer to:
 Brusyliv, Zhytomyr Oblast, a town (urban-type settlement) in Brusyliv Raion, Zhytomyr Oblast, Ukraine
 Brusyliv, Chernihiv Oblast, a village in Chernihiv Raion, Chernihiv Oblast, Ukraine
 Brusyliv Raion, an administrative raion (district) of Zhytomyr Oblast of Ukraine

See also
 Brusilov (disambiguation)